Nienstedt is a village and a former municipality in the Mansfeld-Südharz district, Saxony-Anhalt, Germany. Since 1 January 2010, it has been a part of the town Allstedt. Together with the village Einzingen, it forms an Ortschaft of the town Allstedt.

The earliest known reference to the village is in a record from AD 899, where it is referred to as Ninstat.

References 

Former municipalities in Saxony-Anhalt
Allstedt